The 2014 Belarusian First League is the 24th season of 2nd level football in Belarus. It started in April and finished in November 2014.

Team changes from 2013 season
The winners of last season (Slutsk) were promoted to Belarusian Premier League. They were replaced by last-placed team of 2013 Belarusian Premier League table (Slavia Mozyr).

The runners-up of last season (Gorodeya) lost the promotion/relegation play-off to Dnepr Mogilev (11th-placed Premier League team) and both clubs stayed in their respective leagues.

Two teams that finished at the bottom of 2013 season table (SKVICH Minsk and Polotsk) relegated to the Second League. They were replaced by two best teams of 2013 Second League (Gomelzheldortrans and Neman Mosty).

Neman Mosty eventually refused promotion due to insufficient financing and returned to Second League. They were replaced by Zvezda-BGU Minsk, who finished 3rd in the Second League.

Vedrich-97 Rechitsa were renamed to Rechitsa-2014 before the start of the season.

Teams summary

League table

Promotion play-offs
The 12th placed team of 2014 Premier League (Dnepr Mogilev) will play a two-legged relegation play-off against the third placed team of 2014 Belarusian First League (Vitebsk) for one spot in the 2015 Premier League.

Results

Top goalscorers

Updated to games played on 22 November 2014 Source: football.by

See also
2014 Belarusian Premier League
2013–14 Belarusian Cup
2014–15 Belarusian Cup

External links
 Official site 

Belarusian First League seasons
2
Belarus
Belarus